The Little Rowdy is a 1919 American silent comedy film directed by Harry Beaumont and starring Hazel Daly, Harry Hilliard, and Sidney Ainsworth. The film was released by Triangle Film Corporation on March 23, 1919.

Plot

Cast
Hazel Daly as Betty Hall, the little rowdy
Harry Hilliard as Franklyn Winters
Sidney Ainsworth as Roy Harper

Preservation
The film is now considered lost.

References

External links

1919 comedy films
Silent American comedy films
1919 films
American silent feature films
American black-and-white films
Triangle Film Corporation films
Lost American films
Films directed by Harry Beaumont
1919 lost films
Lost comedy films
1910s American films